The Omaha Knights were a minor league professional ice hockey team that played in Omaha, Nebraska. The Knights were members of the American Hockey Association from 1939 to 1942, until the team went on hiatus during World War II. The Knights returned to the ice, playing in the United States Hockey League from 1945 to 1951. At least two former players are in the Hockey Hall of Fame. Gordie Howe played for the Knights from 1945–1946 and Terry Sawchuk played from 1947–1948.

External links 
 A to Z Encyclopedia of Ice Hockey - Omaha Knights

Defunct ice hockey teams in the United States
Sports in Omaha, Nebraska
Ice hockey teams in Nebraska
Ice hockey clubs established in 1939
Ice hockey clubs disestablished in 1951
1939 establishments in Nebraska
1951 disestablishments in Nebraska